The  Green Bay Packers season was their 65th season overall and their 63rd in the National Football League. The team finished with an 8–8 record under ninth-year head coach Bart Starr to finish second in the NFC Central division. The team set an NFL record for most overtime games played in one season with five, winning two and losing three. On Monday Night Football in October, Green Bay defeated the Washington Redskins, 48–47, in what was at the time the highest-scoring game in MNF history. It was voted one of the ten best Packer games and is featured on the NFL Films collection, "The Green Bay Packers Greatest Games."

Green Bay hovered around the .500 mark all season. Entering their final regular season game on December 18 at Chicago, the Packers (8–7) could secure a playoff berth with a victory. Green Bay scored a touchdown to take a one-point lead with just over three minutes in the game, and Chicago running back Walter Payton was sidelined with a wrist injury. The Bears returned the kickoff to their 38 and drove fifty yards, down to the Packer twelve, with 1:17 remaining. Although Green Bay had all three of its timeouts, they opted not to use any, and the Bears kicked a winning 22-yard field goal with ten seconds on the clock. Green Bay fumbled away the ensuing kickoff, and the Los Angeles Rams (9–7) gained the final playoff slot.

Starr was fired the following day by team president Robert Parins, ending a 26-year association with the team as a player and coach. Former player Forrest Gregg, the head coach of the Cincinnati Bengals, was hired before the end of the week, announced on Christmas Eve. Gregg had led the Bengals to Super Bowl XVI two years earlier, but had less success in his four seasons in Green Bay, then left for his alma mater SMU in Dallas in January 1988.

Offseason

NFL draft

Undrafted free agents

Personnel

Staff

Roster

Preseason

Regular season

Schedule 

Note: Intra-division opponents are in bold text.

Game summaries

Week 1 at Oilers 

Lynn Dickey completed 27 of 31 passes, including 18 straight at one point during the game, for 333 yards and four touchdowns and Jan Stenerud's 42-yard field goal with 9:05 left in overtime give the Packers a successful opening day victory.

Week 16 at Bears

Standings

Statistics

Passing

Receiving

Rushing

Defensive

Records 
 Lynn Dickey, club record, most passing yards in one season, 4,458. First NFC Quarterback to ever throw for over 4,000 yards.
 NFL record, most overtime games played in one season, (5)
 NFC Central record, most interceptions in a season by a passer other than the quarterback (3, Cliff Lewis).

References

External links 
 The Football Database

Green Bay Packers seasons
Green Bay Packers
Green Bay